Shambhuji Thakor
 is a Member of Legislative assembly from Gandhinagar South constituency in Gujarat for its 12th, 13th and 14th legislative assembly.

References

Living people
Bharatiya Janata Party politicians from Gujarat
Gujarat MLAs 2007–2012
Gujarat MLAs 2012–2017
Gujarat MLAs 2017–2022
Year of birth missing (living people)